Milton Courtright Elliott (December 28, 1879 - 1928) was a lawyer and judge from Norfolk, Virginia. He became counsel to the Federal Reserve Board.

Biography
He was born on December 28, 1879, in Norfolk, Virginia, to Warren Grice Elliott (1848-1906) and Margaret Blow. His father was president of the Atlantic Coast Line Railroad. He graduated from the University of Virginia in 1902.

He married Lucy Hamilton Cocke on December 19, 1906. He became counsel to the Federal Reserve Board.

He died in 1928.

References

Federal Reserve System
1879 births
1928 deaths
People from Norfolk, Virginia